Ron Kim may refer to:
Ron Kim (politician), American politician, member of the New York State Assembly
Ronald Kim, Counter-Strike player